Per Blom may refer to:
 Per Blom (canoeist) (born 1949), Norwegian sprint canoer
 Per Blom (director) (1946–2013), Norwegian film director